TDS Metrocom is TDS Telecom's local phone business, providing customers with phone, data, and Internet services in a five-state area in the midwestern United States.  Its central office is located at 3416 University Ave in Madison, Wisconsin. Unlike Telecom, Metrocom used a deal brokered by Tommy Thompson to allow for local phone service competition on AT&T's lines in exchange for long distance plan selling rights over landline. They are no longer offering this service to new residential subscribers, but continue to maintain existing contracts, new features, or new locations on existing accounts.

Current residential status

TDS Metrocom is currently in maintenance mode, where they are allowed to maintain existing telephone and Internet installations but not add any new telephone or Internet accounts. Business accounts are still available.

External links
 TDS Metrocom Webpage

Companies based in Madison, Wisconsin
Internet service providers of the United States